Redcar Bulk Terminal (RBT), also known as Redcar Ore Terminal, is a privately run dock at the mouth of the Tees Estuary in North Yorkshire, England. The port is used for the transhipment of coal and coke (both inward and outward flows) and for many years was the import dock for iron ore destined for Redcar Steelworks under British Steel Corporation, British Steel plc, Corus, Tata Steel Europe and Sahaviriya Steel Industries (SSI UK).

The port is not part of the Teesport estate run by PD Ports but is instead owned by SSI UK (in liquidation). It is one of only four UK ports that are capable of handling Capesize vessels.

History
Located in the borough of Redcar and Cleveland in the ceremonial county of North Yorkshire, the bulk terminal is on the south bank of the River Tees. It is the deepest part of the Teesport area and the deepest port in eastern England. The port is capable of handling Panamax and Capesize vessels, with Redcar being only one of four that can take the Capesize vessels in the United Kingdom.

The site at Redcar had been used as a dock since the 1850s, and had also been investigated by the Shell oil company as possible site for their operations, but despite an optimistic assessment by a hydraulics engineering company, Shell did not build on the site with their operations being located further upstream. The site was chosen by Sir W Halcrow and the new terminal was announced in 1969 when it was also considered as a point of import for iron ore for the Scunthorpe Steelworks, but British Steel Corporation (BSC) opened a second iron ore dock at Immingham to supply the Lincolnshire side of its operations. Whilst primarily an import terminal for Teesside, the terminal began running trains to Consett Steelworks from 1974 for BSC instead of those trains originating on Tyneside.

An enlarged Redcar port with a  quay was opened by the British Steel Corporation (BSC) in 1973 after it had developed the dock area and had the River Tees deepened.

The first vessel to dock there was the "Owari Maru" on the 6 September 1973, a  ship carrying iron ore for the Redcar steelworks.

BSC was privatised into British Steel in 1988 and when British Steel merged with Koninklijke Hoogovens in 1999, the new venture, named Corus, used the facility for the importation of iron ore and coal for the Redcar steelworks. Both Tata, and latterly SSSI (the subsequent owners of the steelworks) used the dock to import raw materials. 
In 2009, the steelworks was closed, but Tata retained control of the dock. When the steelworks site was handed over to SSI in 2011, Tata retained a joint stake in the dock to allow them the flexibility to still use it to import coal and iron ore if necessary.

Tata Steel's 50% stake in the venture was later sold to British Steel Limited in 2017 but in February 2020 this was acquired by SSI, therefore returning the terminal to unified ownership under the Official Receiver (administering SSI UK since its 2015 liquidation), although the berth itself is actually owned by PD Ports.

The port lost a huge tonnage of its business when the SSI steel plant adjacent was mothballed in 2015. The terminal has the ability of unload from a train and load onto another train simultaneously.

In the past, the terminal has despatched trainloads of coal for power stations via many freight operating companies. Imported coal has been moved to power stations (Fiddlers Ferry in 2016 for example) and coal has been forwarded to Redcar from opencast sites in Scotland for export. Due to a downturn in ESI coal imports, trainloads of coal have dropped from 50 per week in 2013 to 15 per week in 2019. The terminal has also been used to import Ground Granulated Blast Furnace Slag (GGBS) to Scunthorpe and also as a forwarding point for unused iron ore from when the adjacent steelworks was closed, both in 2009 and in 2015.

Key products
The letter after the product indicates whether it is imported (I) or exported (E).
Coal (E future) (I)
Coke (E) (I)
GGBS (I)
Iron ore (1972-2015) (I)
Petroleum coke (Petcoke) (I)
Polyhalite (future) (E)
Scrap metal (E)

Redcar is the preferred option for the export of metallurgical coal (for coking) from the Woodhouse Colliery site in West Cumbria. Up to six trains daily would run between Whitehaven and Redcar delivering the coal.

The mineral would arrive at the Bran Sands site via a  underground conveyor belt from the Woodsmith Mine site. RBT would then store and export the mineral via its quayside.

References

Sources

Ports and harbours of Yorkshire
River Tees
Places in the Tees Valley
Transport in Redcar and Cleveland
Teesside
Redcar
Railway freight terminals in the United Kingdom